Puugutaa Island is an island of Greenland. It is located in Tasiusaq Bay in the Upernavik Archipelago.

See also
List of islands of Greenland

References

Islands of the Upernavik Archipelago